Huainan Coal Mining Group is a coal mining company based in Huainan, Anhui, China, and is involved in bituminous and anthracite coal mining, washing, and sales, as well as other industries such as real estate and civil engineering. Previously known as the Huainan Mining Bureau, the company changed to its current name in 1998.

Company developments 
Huainan Mining gained approval for a new coal project from the National Energy Administration in Bojianghaizi County, Inner Mongolia, in 2015. The coal mine is estimated to yield 3 million tonnes per year, after a total investment into the project of about 2.804 billion yuan ($448.6 million).

In December 2016, China Construction Bank, the country's second biggest lender, signed a 30 billion yuan debt-for-equity framework agreement with Huainan Mining Group, to be provided over a five-year term. The agreement included the provision of financial services by CCB, including investment banking and settlement services.

References

Coal companies of China
Government-owned companies of China